Bill Morrison (born November 17, 1965) is an American, New York–based filmmaker and artist. His films often combine rare archival material set to contemporary music, and have been screened in theaters, cinemas, museums, galleries, and concert halls around the world.

Early life and career
Morrison was born in Chicago, Illinois. He attended Reed College from 1983 to 1985, and graduated with a BFA from the Cooper Union School of Art in 1989. 
He received the President's Citation from Cooper Union in 2016.

Morrison had a mid-career retrospective at New York's Museum of Modern Art, October 2014 – March 2015. He is a fellow of the John Simon Guggenheim Memorial Foundation, and has received the Alpert Awards in the Arts, a grant from the National Endowment for the Arts, Creative Capital, and the Foundation for Contemporary Arts Grants to Artists award (2003).

His theatrical projection design with Ridge Theater has been recognized with two Bessie Awards, and an Obie Award.

Morrison has collaborated with some of the most influential composers and performers including John Adams, Gavin Bryars, Bill Frisell, Philip Glass, Michael Gordon, Henryk Górecki, Jóhann Jóhannsson, Kronos Quartet, David Lang, Steve Reich, Michael Harrison, Maya Beiser, Julia Wolfe and Michael Montes among many others. Morrison has occasionally acted in other directors' films, notably Andrew Bujalski's Mutual Appreciation and its quasi-sequel Peoples House.

Accolades
Decasia (2002), his feature-length collaboration with composer Michael Gordon, was selected by the Library of Congress to its National Film Registry in 2013, becoming the first film of the 21st century selected to the list. It has been hailed by J. Hoberman as "the most widely praised American avant-garde film of the fin de siècle." The director Errol Morris reportedly commented while viewing Decasia that "This may be the greatest movie ever made". The film was originally commissioned by the Basel Sinfonietta to be shown on three screens surrounding the audience, behind which 55 musicians performed Michael Gordon's score.

In 2011, Spark of Being, a collaboration with composer/trumpeter Dave Douglas, won The Douglas Edwards Experimental/Independent Film/Video Award at the 2011 Los Angeles Film Critics Association Awards.

In 2014, The Great Flood, a collaboration with composer/guitarist Bill Frisell, received the Smithsonian Magazine's American Ingenuity Award for Historical Scholarship.

In 2016 Morrison presented the world premiere of Dawson City: Frozen Time in the Orizzonti section of the 73rd Venice International Film Festival, and the North American premiere at the 54th New York Film Festival. In 2017, The film was released by Kino Lorber, and was named the Best Documentary of 2017 by the Boston Society of Film Critics, was awarded a Critics' Choice Award for Most Innovative Documentary, an International Documentary Association (IDA) Creative Recognition Award for Best Editing, and was included on over 100 critics lists of the best films of 2017. In 2019 it was released on DVD and Blu-ray in the UK by Second Run DVD. 

Morrison's collected works through 2014 were released as a 5-disc box set from Icarus Films in September 2014, and a 3-disc Blu-ray box set from the British Film Institute in May 2015.

Critics have commented on the historical dimensions of Morrison's works. Writing about Dawson City: Frozen Time (2016) in The New York Review of Books, Deborah Eisenberg noted, "It’s chastening to witness the pliant material of history as it’s being made and at the same time what that history has come to mean and what it has brought into being." And in the Los Angeles Review of Books, Seth Fein observed that The Village Detective: A Song Cycle (2021) "clarifies how time itself has been the evolving preoccupation of Morrison’s works and, consequently, their most significant contribution, not simply to the history of film but to the practice of history."

Filmography as director
 The Village Detective: A Song Cycle (2021)
 Cinematograph (2018)
 Electricity (2018)
 The Unchanging Sea (2018)
 The Letter (2018)
 Weaving (2018)
 Dawson City: Postscript (2017)
 Dawson City: Frozen Time (2016)
 Little Orphant Annie (2016)
 The Dockworker's Dream (2016)
 Back to the Soil (2014)
 Beyond Zero: 1914-1918 (2014)
 The Great Flood (2013)
 All Vows (2013)
 Re:Awakenings (2013)
 Just Ancient Loops (2012)
 Tributes - Pulse (2011)
 The Miners' Hymns (2011)
 Spark of Being (2010)
 Release (2010)
 Dystopia (2008)
 Fuel (2007)
 Who By Water (2007)
 The Highwater Trilogy (2006)
 How To Pray (2006)
 Outerborough (2005)
 Gotham (2004)
 Light is Calling (2004)
 The Mesmerist (2003)
 East River (2003)
 Decasia (2002)
 Trinity (2000)
 Ghost Trip (2000)
 City Walk (1999)
 The Film of Her (1996)
 Nemo (1995)
 The World Is Round (1994)
 The Death Train (1993)
 Footprints (1992)
 Photo Op (1992)
 Lost Avenues (1991)
 Night Highway (1990)

References

External links
Bill Morrison's website
The film archaeologist. An interview with Bill Morrison—video by Louisiana Channel
 on YouTube (including excerpts from Decasia and the entire 2004 short Light Is Calling on HD)
The Films of Bill Morrison. Aesthetics of the Archive. (Ed. Bernd Herzogenrath, Amsterdam UP, 2018). Link to the publisher's page

American experimental filmmakers
1965 births
Living people
Reed College alumni
Cooper Union alumni
Collage filmmakers